William T. McCaffrey  was a professional baseball player who played pitcher in the Major Leagues for the 1885 Cincinnati Red Stockings.  His Major League debut came as the starting pitcher against the Brooklyn Trolley Dodgers on June 15, 1885, a game McCaffrey and the Red Stockings won despite McCaffrey giving up 9 runs, 6 of them earned, as the Red Stockings scored 11 runs in the game against Brooklyn's starting pitcher Adonis Terry.  In 1886, Terry played for the Wilkes-Barre's minor league team in the Pennsylvania State Association.

References

External links

Major League Baseball pitchers
Cincinnati Red Stockings (AA) players
19th-century baseball players
Wilkes-Barre (minor league baseball) players
Lynn Lions players
Baseball players from Maryland
Date of birth missing
Date of death missing